Rahman Cabinet is the name of either of four cabinets of Malaysia (including Federation of Malaya):
Cabinet Rahman I (1955–1959)
Cabinet Rahman II (1959–1964)
Cabinet Rahman III (1964–1969)
Cabinet Rahman IV (1969–1970)